Inside the Hollow is the second album by the Canadian all-girl rock band Lillix, released in Canada on 29 August 2006 and Japan on 6 September 2006. It was released in Europe and the United States on 1 January 2007.

The first single released from the album was "Sweet Temptation (Hollow)". Its music video was premiered on Yahoo!'s LAUNCHcast on 5 July 2006, and was shown on MTV's Making the Video. The album was made available for listening online via MuchMusic.com, and several songs are available on the band's official MySpace site.

Track listing

Singles 
 "Sweet Temptation (Hollow)" - July 2006

References

Lillix albums
2006 albums
Maverick Records albums